Pannonian Croatia may refer to:

 Slavs in Lower Pannonia#In Croatian historiography, a medieval duchy previously referred to as "Pannonian Croatia"
 Parts of modern-day Croatia in the Pannonian plain, roughly corresponding to the Continental Croatia statistical region (2012-2020)
 Pannonian Croatia (NUTS-2), one of the NUTS statistical regions of Croatia since 2021

See also
 Croatia (disambiguation)